Mandol District is a district of Nuristan Province in eastern Afghanistan. It was originally in Laghman Province and then was moved to the newly created Nuristan Province in 2001.

References

External links
 Map of Natural Hazards & Settlements iMMap

Districts of Nuristan Province